Vicente Dopico Lerner (born April 22, 1943, died October 15, 2020) was a Cuban painter. Dopico Lerner also wrote on Latin American art and was the director of the Cuban Museum of Art and Culture in Miami.

Education
Lerner received a B.A and a M.A. in fine arts from St. Thomas University in Miami and studied visual arts, watercolor, drawing, painting and design at the Art Students League of New York in Manhattan.

Exhibitions

Solo exhibitions
His artistic works had been exhibited in Galería Arawak in Santo Domingo, Dominican Republic in 1994. In 1995 in Viva Galería in New York City. In 1997 he had an exhibition in the Museo de Arte Moderno, Santo Domingo, Dominican Republic and in 2001 in Havana, Cuba he showed at the Convento de San Francisco de Asís.

Collective exhibitions
He participated in an exhibition at the Cuban Museum Art and Culture in Miami, Florida in 1977. He was also involved in an exhibition displayed in the Society of Fine Arts in Tallahassee, Florida in 1987. In 1993, at the Watercolor Art Council, New Orleans, Louisiana. Three years later, he showed his works in the Instituto de Cultura Puertoriqueña in San Juan, Puerto Rico.

Awards
Dopico received the Cintas Foundation Fellowship, New York, in 1976 and three years later the  Society of Fine Arts, St. Petersburg, Florida.

References
 
  Jose Veigas-Zamora, Cristina Vives Gutierrez, Adolfo V. Nodal, Valia Garzon, Dannys Montes de Oca; Memoria: Cuban Art of the 20th Century; (California/International Arts Foundation 2001); 
 Jose Viegas; Memoria: Artes Visuales Cubanas Del Siglo Xx; (California International Arts 2004);

External links

 Dopico-Lerner's webpage
 South Art Dealer webpage on the artist
 Ed Chasen Fine Art Gallery webpage on the artist
 Latin Art Museum webpage on the artist
 Gallery Exodo webpage on the artist
 Collection Privee webpage on the artist
 

1945 births

2020 deaths

Artists from Havana

Cuban Jews

Cuban male painters
Cuban contemporary artists
Jewish painters
Modern painters
Art Students League of New York alumni